A khutor  or khutir (pl. , khutory) is a type of rural locality in some countries of Eastern Europe; in the past the term mostly referred to a single-homestead settlement. The term can be translated as "hamlet".

They existed in Cossack-settled lands that encompassed today's Ukraine, Kuban, and the lower Don River basin while in Kuban and Don region the word khutor was also used to describe new settlements (irrespective of the number of homesteads) which had detached themselves from stanitsas. In some Cossack communities, these types of settlements were referred to as posyolok or selyshche. In Russia the term "" (vyselki, literally, "those who moved away") was also used. Khutor remains the official designation of many Russian villages in these regions.

During the Stolypin reforms in the Russian empire, Peter Stolypin envisaged rich peasants "privatising" their share of the community (obshchina or tovarystvo) lands, leaving the obshchinas, and settling in khutors on their now individually owned land.  A less radical concept was that of an otrub (отруб) or vidrub: a section of formerly obshchina land, whose owner has left the obshchina but still continued to live in the village and to "commute" to his land. By 1910 the share of khutors and otrubs among all rural households in the European part of Russia was estimated at 10.5%. These were practically eliminated during the collectivisation in the USSR.

Linguistic origin 
The origin of the word is not entirely clear. Borrowing from Hungarian is assumed. határ "border, border", to which the Slavs are reduced. határ "border, edge", Serbo-Croatian. khȁtȃr "land belonging to the village", Ukrainian hotar.

According to Max Fassmer, the word entered the East Slavic languages from Old Upper German.

In literature

Nikolai Gogol's first major work is called Evenings on a Farm Near Dikanka, where "farm" is a translation of "khutor" (Vechera na khutore bliz Dikanki).

See also
Ranch

References

Economic history of Russia
Economic history of Ukraine
Social history of Ukraine
Rural geography
Human habitats
Types of administrative division
Russian-language designations of territorial entities